Valentina Timofeyeva is a retired Russian coxswain who won five European titles between 1960 and 1964, often competing in two events at the same championships.

References

Year of birth missing (living people)
Living people
Russian female rowers
Soviet female rowers
Coxswains (rowing)
European Rowing Championships medalists